George Bernard Noble (1892 – November 29, 1972) was an American scholar.

He was educated at the University of Washington and the University of Oxford, where he was a Rhodes scholar. He was awarded the Distinguished Service Cross for his service in World War I, where he served as a first lieutenant in the Army.

At the Paris Peace Conference that drafted the Treaty of Versailles in 1919, Noble was attached to the American Peace Commission with the responsibility of tracking the French press' daily reactions to the deliberations of the Conference. In 1935 Macmillan published Noble's findings as Policies and Opinions at Paris, 1919.

During 1941–1942 he was a member of the Oregon State Senate and served as chairman of the War Labor Board during World War II. From 1946 until 1962 he was director of the Department of State Historical Office, where he oversaw the publication of the Foreign Relations of the United States series. He also wrote a biography of Christian Herter, which was published in 1970.

Noble was a member of the American Political Science Association, the American Historical Association and Phi Beta Kappa.

Notes

1892 births
1972 deaths
University of Washington alumni
Alumni of the University of Oxford
American Rhodes Scholars
Recipients of the Distinguished Service Cross (United States)
Oregon state senators
Reed College faculty
20th-century American politicians